Cobbins is a surname. Notable people with the surname include:

Chris Cobbins (born 1984), American musician
Lyron Cobbins (born 1974), American football player
Michael Cobbins (born 1992), American basketball player

See also
Cobbins Brook, a river of Essex, England
Hobbins